La Ouache is the first studio album by the French rock band Matmatah.

Track listing
Anter-Ouache - Ouache
Emma
Lambé an Dro
Troglodyte
Kerfautras
Dernière Journée en Mer
L'Apologie
La Fille du Chat Noir
An Den Coz
Derrière Ton Dos
Les Moutons
La Complainte de Fanch
Ribette's

(Track listing acquired from Amazon.com's listings  and )

1998 debut albums
Matmatah albums